Anxious Records (sometimes typeset as AnXious) was a record label set up by David A. Stewart of Eurythmics, and overseen by Stewart with Infectious Music's Korda Marshall (when Marshall was at BMG/RCA Records). Originally set up as a BMG label, the company went independent when Stewart left RCA Records, with his 1994 Eastwest album Greetings from the Gutter being licensed from Anxious. The label is best known for groups including Londonbeat, Curve and the Dutch band Soft Parade, as well as ex-Specials singer Terry Hall, who was also previously a member of Vegas with Stewart.

Anxious Records
Anxious Records signed the following acts:

 Chris Braide
 Curve
 Freaks of Desire
 Terry Hall
 Toni Halliday
 JC-001
 Londonbeat
 Jimmy Nellis
 Miss World
 Nan Vernon
 Jonathan Perkins
 Pleasure*
 Soft Parade (NL)
 The Starlings
 Anka Wolbert
 Nick Green
 The Flame

See also
 List of record labels

References

Defunct record labels of the United Kingdom
Vanity record labels